Chris Anastasi, born 22 August 1987 to a Greek-Cypriot and Italian family, is a British screenwriter and actor. After starting as an actor at a young age, Anastasi has since moved into screen writing where he has made his name.

Career
After attending St Benedict’s catholic secondary school and performing arts college, Anastasi's career first began when he was selected for BBC's Drama series submission 2014 and was, soon after, chosen from a high number of applicants for comedy screen writing training with the BFI. His first film, which had wide cinema release in 2019, was Madness in the Method and stars such actors as Jason Mewes, Kevin Smith, Danny Trejo and Stan Lee. He currently has a comedy television series in pre-production. His experience ranges from working on stage production, The Children's Monologues with Danny Boyle, to working with Thin Man Films and Mike Leigh's own trusted crew.

His other writing credits can be found on BBC Radio 4’s Newsjack, Hattrick’s Podcast series SeanceCast (nominated for a BBC Audio Drama Award) and Pulped TV’s sketch series. His first short film, Annie Waits, has won multiple awards including the Women in Hollywood Award for best film. He has also been selected for the BBC Comedy Writers Room 2020-21 out of thousands of applicants.

Although Anastasi's time is mainly devoted to screenwriting, he does make acting appearances as per his performance in ITV's Grantchester  season 2 finale and has also appeared in shows such as Humans, Grantchester, The Rook, and Channel 4 comedy sketches. .

Filmography

Film

TV

References

External links

1987 births
Living people
English screenwriters
English male screenwriters
21st-century English male actors
English male television actors
People from Derby